Bernard Serrigny (1870-1954) was a French general.

Serrigny was a captain at the start of World War I, and aide to Philippe Pétain.

In 1924, Serrigny published an article in  advocating for the proper management of French resources, colonial and otherwise, during times of war.

Works

References

French generals
French military personnel of World War I
1870 births
1954 deaths